Ridali Airfield is an airfield in Estonia, about  north of Võru in the vicinity of Ridali - a place known for its scenery, lakes, fields and forests, giving glider pilots many visual reference points to navigate by. The airfield was used during World War II, and in the early 1960s it started serving glider pilots. The first gliders to fly in Ridali were Soviet KAI-12s (improved design from the Czech LF-109). The only way to launch gliders was by using the Czech winch "Herkules". By 1968, the club already had two KAI-12s, three Blaníks, two towing winches and a Yak-12 for aerotows.

Ridali Airfield is currently the home of Ridali Gliding Club.

Aircraft in service

See also
List of airports in Estonia

References

External links
Ridali Gliding Club

Airports in Estonia
Põlva Parish
Buildings and structures in Põlva County